Roy Alfred Roper (born 11 August 1923) is a New Zealand former rugby union player. A three-quarter, Roper represented Taranaki at a provincial level, and was a member of the New Zealand national side, the All Blacks, from 1949 to 1950. He played five matches for the All Blacks, all of them internationals. He later served as treasurer of the Taranaki Rugby Football Union from 1952 to 1971.

During World War II, Roper served overseas with the Royal New Zealand Navy and appeared in six matches for the New Zealand Services XV in England.

Since the death of Ron Elvidge in 2019, Roper has held the distinction of being the oldest living All Black.

References

1923 births
Living people
Rugby union players from Manawatū-Whanganui
People educated at New Plymouth Boys' High School
Royal New Zealand Navy personnel of World War II
New Zealand rugby union players
New Zealand international rugby union players
Taranaki rugby union players
Rugby union wings
New Zealand sports executives and administrators
Rugby union centres